Skylon may refer to:
 Skylon (Festival of Britain), a landmark structure of the 1951 Festival of Britain
 Skylon (spacecraft), a proposed orbital spaceplane
 Skylon Tower, an observation tower in Niagara Falls, Ontario
 Skylon (album), a 2008 album by Ott
 "Skylon!", a 2007 song by Gruff Rhys from Candylion